MFC 17: Hostile Takeover was a mixed martial arts event held by the Maximum Fighting Championship (MFC) on July 25th, 2008 in Enoch, Alberta.

Background

Ryan Ford was expected to face Joe Jordan for the vacant MFC Welterweight title, but Jordan was sidelined due to a back injury. Pat Healy stepped in to replace Joe Jordan.

Fight Card

See also 
 Maximum Fighting Championship
 List of Maximum Fighting Championship events
 2008 in Maximum Fighting Championship

References

17
2008 in mixed martial arts
Mixed martial arts in Canada
Sport in Alberta
2008 in Canadian sports
2008 in Alberta